Murray Settlement is a community in the Canadian province of New Brunswick located mainly on Route 126.

History

Notable people

See also
List of communities in New Brunswick

References

Border communities
 Collette
 Barnaby River

Communities in Northumberland County, New Brunswick